The Turkish Women's Second Football League is the third tier league competition for women's association football in Turkey.

Format

Teams promoted to Women's First League

Format 
As of 2022–23 Season, 20 teams compete for promoting to 1st League. They were divided into three groups according to their geographical location. In each group, teams play against each other home-and-away in a round-robin format.

The 3 teams that rank first in their groups at the end of the regular season promote for the 2023–2024 Women's 1st League. The group three runners-up teams, three third-placed teams and two best fourth-placed teams advance to play-offs. Two winner teams of the promotion play-offs qualify for the 1st League. At the end of the regular season, the teams that take the last place in their groups are relegated to the Women's 3rd League.

12 of the teams in the Women's 2nd League will have the right to take part in the Women's 1st League in the 2023–2024 Season.

2022–23 season 
The 2022–23 Turkish Women's Second Football League consists of a total of 20 teams in three groups. The group matches of the league are played in 14 rounds between 12 March and 28 May 2023. The play-off matches will be held in three rounds.

See also 
 Women's football in Turkey
 Turkish Women's Football Super League
 Turkish Women's Football First League
 Turkish Women's Third Football League
 Turkish Women's Regional Football League
List of women's football clubs in Turkey
Turkish women in sports

References

External links 

 Official Site  of the Turkish Football Federation

Sports leagues established in 2008
Second
Tur
Football
Professional sports leagues in Turkey